Batinova Kosa is a village in central Croatia, in the municipality of Topusko, Sisak-Moslavina County. It is connected by the D6 highway.

History

Demographics
According to the 2011 census, the village of Batinova Kosa has 50 inhabitants. This represents 31.46% of its pre-war population according to the 1991 census.

The 1991 census recorded that 93.71% of the village population were ethnic Serbs (149/159), 3.15% were ethnic Croats (5/159), 3.15% were Yugoslavs (5/159), and 3.77% were of other ethnic origin (6/159).

Sights
 Monument to the uprising of the people of Kordun and Banija

Notable natives and residents

See also 
 Glina massacres

References

Populated places in Sisak-Moslavina County
Serb communities in Croatia